Simone Forte (born 20 January 1996) is an Italian male triple jumper.

Biography
In winter 2019 he was finalists at the 2019 European Athletics Indoor Championships and won his first national title.

Personal best
Triple jump: 17.07 m ( Grosseto, 12 June 2021)
Triple jump indoor: 16.76 m ( Ancona, 17 February 2019)

National titles
 Italian Athletics Indoor Championships
 Triple jump: 2019

See also
 Italian all-time lists - Triple jump
 Italy at the 2019 European Athletics Indoor Championships

References

External links

1996 births
Living people
Italian male triple jumpers
Athletics competitors of Fiamme Gialle
Athletes from Rome